Simon Edvinsson (born 5 February 2003) is a Swedish professional ice hockey defenceman currently playing for the  Detroit Red Wings of the National Hockey League (NHL). Considered a top prospect for the 2021 NHL Entry Draft, Edvinsson was selected in the first-round, sixth overall, by the Detroit Red Wings.

Playing career

Edvinsson had six points in 14 games playing for Frölunda HC's junior team in the J20 SuperElit, before making his professional debut in the Swedish Hockey League (SHL) during the 2020–21 season, posting 1 assist in 10 games for Frölunda. Following the season, Edvinsson was the top ranked European defenseman by the NHL Central Scouting Bureau. Behind Luke Hughes, Edvinsson was the second defenseman selected in the 2021 NHL Entry Draft, chosen sixth overall by the Detroit Red Wings on 23 July 2021. 

In the 2021–22 season, his first full season in the SHL, Edvinsson has recorded 19 points in 44 regular season games from the blueline for Frölunda HC. He was named a finalist for the SHL Rookie of the Year Award and led all league rookies with an average of 19:46 time on ice. His 19 points were fourth-most all time for a defenseman under the age of 19 in the SHL. Following a semi-final defeat in the playoffs, Edvinsson was signed by Red Wings to a three-year, entry-level contract on 25 April 2022.

In transitioning to the North American smaller rink, Edvinsson was immediately deployed in a top-pairing role with the Griffins, contributing offensively from the blueline. While leading the team amongst defenseman in scoring, Edvinsson received his first recall to the NHL by the Red Wings on 17 March 2023.

Personal life 
Edvinsson's father, Tobbe is a police officer, and his mother, Åsa, is a personal trainer. He has a younger brother, Hannes. During the offseason, Edvinsson trains in mixed martial arts, which he credits for helping him to control his body. He cites Victor Hedman, Miro Heiskanen, and Cale Makar as role models.

Career statistics

Regular season and playoffs

International

References

External links
 

2003 births
Living people
Detroit Red Wings draft picks
Detroit Red Wings players
Frölunda HC players
Grand Rapids Griffins players
National Hockey League first-round draft picks
People from Kungsbacka Municipality
VIK Västerås HK players
Sportspeople from Halland County